Mako Kudo (born 25 April 1997) is a Japanese professional footballer who plays as a defender for WE League club Nojima Stella Kanagawa Sagamihara.

Club career 
Kudo made her WE League debut on 12 September 2021.

References 

Living people
1997 births
Japanese women's footballers
Women's association football defenders
People from Setagaya
Nojima Stella Kanagawa Sagamihara players
WE League players